Kritou Marottou is a village in the Paphos District of Cyprus, located 2 km east of Fyti.

References

Communities in Paphos District